Christophe Zakhia El-Kassis (born 24 August 1968 in Beirut, Lebanon) is a Lebanese Catholic bishop, diplomat, and Maronite archbishop. He currently serves as the Apostolic Nuncio to the United Arab Emirates.

Life 
El-Kassis graduated utroque iure, doctorate in both civil law and church law. He received the sacrament of Holy Orders on 21 May 1994. He joined the diplomatic service of the Holy See on 19 June 2000, and has served in the Apostolic Nunciatures in Indonesia, the Sudan and Turkey. From 2007 until 2018, he served at the Foreign Relations office of the Secretariat of State in the Holy See.

He is fluent in Lebanese, Arabic, French, Italian, English, Indonesian, Spanish, and German

On 24 November 2018 Pope Francis appointed him as Titular Archbishop of Rusellae and named him Apostolic Nuncio to Pakistan. He received his episcopal consecration in St. Peter Basilica on 19 January 2019 from Cardinal Pietro Parolin as Principal Consecrator, who was accompanied by Cardinal Dominique Mamberti and Archbishop Paul Youssef Matar.

On 3 January 2023, Pope Francis appointed him as the Apostolic Nuncio to the United Arab Emirates. He is to be the first nuncio who will be a resident in the Nunciature in Abu Dhabi which was opened in February 2022.

See also
 List of heads of the diplomatic missions of the Holy See

References

1968 births
Living people
Lebanese Roman Catholic archbishops
Apostolic Nuncios to Pakistan
Apostolic Nuncios to United Arab Emirates
Roman Catholic titular archbishops
Lebanese expatriates in Pakistan
Religious leaders from Beirut
Catholic Church in the Middle East
Roman Catholic bishops in the Middle East